Philip de Lannoy, 2nd Prince of Sulmona (4 November 1544 - 4 November 1561) was an Italian military leader in Spanish service.  At the Battle of Ceresole, he commanded the Neapolitan light cavalry.

He was the son of Charles de Lannoy, 1st Prince of Sulmona.

References

 Oman, Charles. A History of the Art of War in the Sixteenth Century.  London: Methuen & Co., 1937.

Military leaders of the Italian Wars
16th-century Italian nobility
Ph
1544 births
1561 deaths